Ashley Havinden (1903–1973) was an influential British graphic designer in the mid twentieth century, specializing in posters, advertisements, logos and typography, he was also a textile and rug designer. In 1947 he was appointed a Royal Designer for Industry.

Early career
Havinden worked for the important advertising agency W.S. Crawford from the age of 19 where he was influenced by Stanley Morison who had introduced the sans serif faces for Monotype. The American designer Edward McKnight Kauffer was another influence. Havinden began to use asymmetrical layouts and new forms of lettering which he combined with the pithy words of copywriter Bingy Mills to produce a distinct style.

Typefaces
For Monotype he created the font Ashley Crawford (1930). In 1955 Monotype also released the typeface Ashley Script, by which he immortalised his own handwriting in type.

References

Further reading
Ashley Havinden: Advertising and the artist. National Galleries of Scotland, 1999.

External links

Ashley Havinden items in the Victoria & Albert Museum.

Royal Designers for Industry & Britain Can Make It

British graphic designers
1903 births
1973 deaths
British textile designers